Caradrina multifera, the speckled rustic moth, is a moth of the family Noctuidae. The species was first described by Francis Walker in 1857. It is found in North America from Newfoundland to North Carolina and Tennessee and west to Minnesota and Manitoba. It is also present in British Columbia and Washington.

The wingspan is 30–32 mm. Adults have pale gray forewings with black zigzag lines, although these are sometimes broken into dots. The reniform spot is black with white dots around the perimeter. The hindwings are whitish basally, but have gray shading distally. They are on wing from July to October in one generation per year.

References

Moths described in 1857
Caradrinini
Moths of North America